Riverside Park may refer to:

Inhabited places
 Riverside Park, Alberta, Canada
 Riverside Park, Ottawa, Canada
 Riverside Park, California, United States

Parks

Canada
 Riverside Park (Kamloops), British Columbia
 Riverside Park (Guelph), Ontario
 Riverside Park, Montreal, Quebec

United Kingdom
 Riverside Park, Guildford, Surrey, England
 Riverside Country Park, Kent, England
 Riverside Park, Glenrothes, Fife, Scotland

United States

 Riverside Park (Jacksonville), Florida
 Riverside Park, Vero Beach, Florida
 Riverside Park (Indianapolis), Indiana
 Riverside Park, Oswego, Kansas, a National Register of Historic Places listing in Labette County, Kansas
 Riverside Park, Wichita, Kansas
 Riverside Park (Baltimore), Maryland
 Riverside Park, Cumberland, Maryland, current site of the oldest Headquarters of George Washington
 Riverside Park, site of the Riverside Park Dance Pavilion in Merrick county, Nebraska
 Riverside Park (Red Bank, New Jersey)
 Riverside Park (Buffalo, New York)
 Riverside Park (Manhattan), New York City, New York
 Riverside State Park, Nine Mile Falls, Washington
 Riverside Park (La Crosse), Wisconsin
 Riverside Park, Milwaukee, Wisconsin
 Riverside Park (Pittsville, Wisconsin)

Amusement parks
 Riverside Motorsports Park, a proposed motorsports-themed entertainment park in Merced County, California, US
 Riverside Park (Massachusetts), former name of the amusement park Six Flags New England, US

Sports venues

Jamaica
 Riverside Park, Clarendon, home ground of Sporting Central Academy F.C.

United Kingdom
 Riverside Park, Jedburgh, Scotland, home ground of Jed-Forest RFC

United States
 Riverside Park (Arizona), a baseball park in Phoenix
 Riverside Park, Dawson Springs, Kentucky, a baseball park
 Riverside Park (stadium), a former baseball park in Buffalo, New York
 Riverside Park (Austin), a former baseball park in Texas
 Riverside Park (Dallas), a former baseball park in Texas

See also
 Riverfront Park (disambiguation)
 Riverside Amusement Park (disambiguation)
 Riverside Stadium, a football stadium in Middlesbrough, England
 Riverview Park (disambiguation)